Figaro Here, Figaro There (Italian: Figaro qua, Figaro là) is a 1950 Italian historical comedy film directed by Carlo Ludovico Bragaglia and starring Totò and Isa Barzizza. The title and the plot allude to The Barber of Seville. It was made at Scalera Studios in Rome. Set design was by Alberto Boccianti.

Plot
The film is set in the eighteenth century. The protagonist is Figaro, the Sevillian barber, who is likely to be arrested because he operates his shop on Sundays, which is forbidden. Figaro is a friend of a nobleman who fell in love with Rosina, his friend and daughter of the governor. But Rosina's father does not agree to their marriage. One day Rosina, through her maid Dove, tells the Count that one night she is staying at the inn "of four bulls". The Count and Figaro go with a friend to the inn before they get to Rosina and her court.

Their plan is to replace the host, pose as their owners of the inn and abduct Rosina. But unfortunately not all is according to plan. Pedro, a dangerous bandit, learns that Rosina and her court must stay at the inn that night and his men raid the inn: they capture Figaro, the Count and his friend. Finally Rosina comes and is disappointed when she sees that her beloved is not there. Figaro, however, has an idea: he writes a note to tell her that the man in the white hat is Pedro. Unfortunately at that time soldiers capture Figaro and Pedro, and stop believing that it is Pedro and the plan fails. Figaro is sentenced to death by firing squad, but in the end escapes helped by the Count. Eventually, after many vicissitudes, Count marries Rosina and Figaro goes to live with them.

Cast
Totò as Figaro
Isa Barzizza as Rosina
Gianni Agus as Count of Almaviva
Renato Rascel as Don Alonzo
Guglielmo Barnabò as Don Bartolo
Jole Fierro as Colomba
Luigi Pavese as Pedro
Franca Marzi as Consuelo
 Pietro Tordi as Fiorello
 Ugo Sasso as Hurtado
 Mario Siletti as the president of the court
 Mario Castellani as the actor
 Giulio Calì as the barber help

References

Bibliography
 Ennio Bìspuri. Totò: principe clown : tutti i film di Totò. Guida Editori, 1997.

External links
 

1950 films
1950s Italian-language films
1950s historical comedy films
Films directed by Carlo Ludovico Bragaglia
Films set in the 18th century
Films set in Seville
Films shot at Scalera Studios
Films based on The Barber of Seville (play)
Lux Film films
Italian historical comedy films
1950 comedy films
Italian black-and-white films
1950s Italian films